Tearii Te Moana Alpha (born 5 December 1971) is a French Polynesian politician. Since 2014 he has served as Mayor of Teva I Uta. He was Vice-President of the territory briefly in 2011, and again from 2020-2021. He is a founding member of Tahoeraa Huiraatira.

In 1997 Alpha completed a thesis in biological sciences at the French Pacific University.

In October 2004 he was appointed Minister of Fisheries in the government of Gaston Flosse. In December of that year he was appointed as head of Tahoeraa Huiraatira's youth wing. He later served as Minister of Lands.

On 2 March 2011 he was appointed as Vice President by Gaston Tong Sang, replacing Édouard Fritch. He ran for the French National Assembly as a candidate for To Tatou Aia in the 2012 election.

In march 2014 he was elected mayor of Teva I Uta, defeating Valentina Cross.

In April 2018, in the leadup to the 2018 elections, he was accused with other Tapura Huiraatira members of using public money to fund his election campaign. In September 2020 he was appointed vice-president following the resignation of Teva Rohfritsch.

On 14 February 2021 he was elected as president of the community of municipalities of Tereheamanu.

In August 2021 a wedding ceremony for Alpha reportedly violated Covid-19 rules. In November 2021 he was fired as Vice-President after refusing to comply with the territory's mandatory vaccination law. However, he retained his ministerial portfolios, a decision which led to the resignation from Cabinet of Nicole Bouteau. He was replaced as Vice-President by Jean-Christophe Bouissou.

References

 Living people
1971 births
Mayors of places in French Polynesia
Tapura Huiraatira politicians
Government ministers of French Polynesia
Members of the Assembly of French Polynesia
University of French Polynesia alumni